Hannay  may refer to:

 Clan Hannay, a Lowland Scottish clan
 Hannay baronets, including a list of people who have held the title
 Richard Hannay, a fictional character in novels, films, television and on the stage
 Hannay (TV series), British television series about Richard Hannay

People with the surname
 Alastair Hannay (born 1932), British philosopher and academic
 Barbara Hannay, Australian romance novelist
 David Hannay (historian) (1853–1934), English naval historian
 David Hannay, Baron Hannay of Chiswick (born 1935), British diplomat
 David Hannay (producer) (1939-2014), Australian film producer
 James Hannay (writer) (1827–1873), Scottish novelist, journalist and diplomat
 James Ballantyne Hannay (1855–1931), Scottish chemist
 Josh Hannay (born 1980), Australian rugby league footballer
 Nathan Hannay (born 1984), English rugby player
 Robert Kerr Hannay (1867-1940), Scottish historian
 Sir Samuel Hannay, 3rd Baronet (died 1790), of the Hannay baronets, MP for Camelford
 Thomas Hannay (1887-1970), British Anglican bishop

See also
 Hanny, a given name, nickname and surname

Surnames of Scottish origin